AudioComics Company is an audio production company that adapts comic books, graphic novels, and original works. It was founded in 2010, and expanded under the producers William Dufris, Lance Roger Axt, and Elaine Lee. Their productions have earned critical acclaim and awards in the United States and abroad, and have been cited as a "game changer" in the field of audio drama.

Overview 

The company produces full-cast audio adventures, based on licensed properties and original works from the world of comic books, graphic novels, and genre fiction, and distributes them by MP3, digital download, and CDs. The company has its origins in Play it by Ear Productions, an audio theatre company run by producer/writer/actor Lance Roger Axt to adapt original plays for radio and digital mediums. Producer/actor William Dufris, known as the voice of the cartoon character Bob The Builder, co-founded AudioComics Company with Axt in 2010 initially to adapt comics and graphic novels as audio productions, with full voice casts, sound effects, and musical scores.

Their first production in 2010 was an adaption of the science fiction spoof Starstruck, a stage play written by its director and star Elaine Lee and designed by illustrator Michael Wm. Kaluta. Lee wrote the new audio adaption, and participated in the voice cast along with her son, actor and comedian Brennan Lee Mulligan. After the success of this project, Lee joined Dufris and Axt as a co-producer in their successive productions.

Since 2010, the AudioComics Company has adapted comics projects like Starstruck, Titanium Rain, Molly Danger, Perhapanauts, and Locke & Key. They expanded to production of new stories of Pulp magazine characters like The Domino Lady in 2012; actor Karen Stilwell reprised this role in the 2013 adaption of Moonstone Comics' "Battle For LA", a team-up story starring other public domain heroes like The Black Bat, The Phantom Detective, Airboy, and Secret Agent X. They continued into new pulp fiction starring detective Honey West, adapted by Elaine Lee from a Moonstone Comics series she had created with artist Ronn Sutton. The company branched into original genre fiction with adaptations of Tom Kirkbride's young adult book Gamadin and Jeffery Deaver's thriller The Starling Project.

Notable contributors 

William Dufris, a noted voice actor (Spider-Man, Bob the Builder) and audiobook reader, has contributed Direction and Sound Design for the company, as well as co-production.

Lance Roger Axt, the director of Play it by Ear Productions, has written, directed, and co-produced.

Elaine Lee, an Emmy-nominated actor and writer of the Starstruck and Galactic Girl Guides comics series, has written and co-produced adaptations.

Illustrators Michael Wm. Kaluta and Lee Moyer have contributed new artwork as covers for adaptions.

Denise Poirier, the voice of Æon Flux, played the lead villain in the Starstruck audioplay.

Comics artist Jamal Igle (Supergirl) created artwork for the audio adaption of his creator-owned character, Molly Danger.

Alfred Molina (Raiders of the Lost Ark, Spider-Man 2) played the lead role in Jeffery Deaver's The Starling Project.

The adaption of Locke & Key, based on the horror comic series by writer Joe Hill and artist Gabriel Rodriguez, received widespread coverage noting the participation of actors Tatiana Maslany (Orphan Black), Haley Joel Osment (The Sixth Sense), and Kate Mulgrew (Star Trek: Voyager).

Awards and nominations 

Since 2010 The AudioComics Company has received several award nominations and awards, most notably in 2013 when it was nominated for and won awards for its production of Titanium Rain. The company has also won noted industry awards for Honey West, Perhapanauts, and The Starling Project.

Critical response 

About the AudioComics Company adaption of Molly Danger, Major Spoilers wrote, "the creators did an excellent job of bringing the world of Molly Danger to life between the ears.  There’s solid acting from everyone." Geekquality wrote, "Olivia DuFord as Molly Danger manages to capture a perfect blend of childlike sweetness and sad world weariness that are to be expected from a 30-something living as an eternal pre-teen."

The Chicago Tribune wrote of The Starling Project, "this smart production makes full use of all that audio allows, employing actors who create distinctive voices" AudioFile Magazine wrote of the production, "With its hypnotic musical score and sound effects of gunshots, squealing tires, and all-too-close explosions, listeners may believe they’re listening to a movie soundtrack."

Of the adaptation of Locke & Key, Paste Magazine wrote that the audioplay was "an immersive sonic experience brought to life by a top-flight cast of voice actors including genre icons Kate Mulgrew, Tatiana Maslany, and Haley Joel Osment." io9 wrote, "The production is a stunning adaptation." SFFaudio wrote,  "it’s a great story as a graphic novel, and this production successfully captures it, the flawless cast and rich sound adding a new and welcome dimension to the whole."

References

External links 
 Official homepage

American companies established in 2010